KTYV (105.7 FM) is a radio station licensed to serve the community of Steamboat Springs, Colorado. The station is owned by Kenneth Clark, and airs a sports radio format.

The station was assigned the call sign KGGH by the Federal Communications Commission on July 19, 2016. The station changed its call sign to KKSB on November 9, 2017, and to KTYV on June 11, 2018.

References

External links
 Official Website
 

TYV (FM)
Radio stations established in 2016
2016 establishments in Colorado
Sports radio stations in the United States
Routt County, Colorado